János Hajdú (born 1898 in Komló) was a Hungarian footballer and coach.

He became known for having been the player/manager of S.S.C. Bari during the 1930–31 Serie B season.

Previously, he played as midfielder in NAK Novi Sad in 1924 in Yugoslavia, and in Italy in FC Liberty Bari in the 1924–25 and 1925–26 Prima Divisione seasons.

References

1898 births
People from Komló
Hungarian footballers
Hungarian expatriate footballers
Association football midfielders
NAK Novi Sad players
Expatriate footballers in Yugoslavia
S.S.C. Bari players
Expatriate footballers in Italy
S.S.C. Bari managers
Expatriate football managers in Italy
Hungarian football managers
Year of death missing
Sportspeople from Baranya County